Papua New Guinea competed at the 2022 Commonwealth Games in Birmingham, England between 28 July and 8 August 2022. It was the fifteenth time that Papua New Guinea competes at the Games.

Boxer John Ume and Track and field athlete Rellie Kaputin were the country's opening ceremony flagbearers.

Medalists

Competitors
The following is the list of number of competitors participating at the Games per sport/discipline.

Athletics (track and field)

On 6 July, 2022, Athletics Papua New Guinea announced a team of eighteen athletes (10 men and 8 women).

Men
Track and road events

Field events

 Combined events – Decathlon

Women
Track and road events

Field events

Combined events – Heptathlon

Boxing

Men

Squash

Singles

Doubles

Swimming

Men

Women

Table tennis

Papua New Guinea qualified two players for the table tennis competitions.

Singles

Doubles

Weightlifting

Papua New Guinea qualified two weightlifters (one man, one woman) via the IWF Commonwealth Ranking List, which was finalised on 9 March 2022.

References

External links
Papua New Guinea Olympic Committee Official site

Nations at the 2022 Commonwealth Games
Papua New Guinea at the Commonwealth Games
2022 in Papua New Guinean sport